Faisal Fahad Al-Ketbi (born 15 October 1987) is a Emirati wrestler and grappler who represents his native country United Arab Emirates at sport jujitsu (JJIF) and previously in olympic freestyle wrestling.

Career 
He began combat sports at age of 10 in hometown Abu Dhabi and soon he specialized on olympic freestyle wrestling. He participated at 2010 Asian Games but he has never reached top level in freestyle wrestling. Around 2010 he switch the sport for sport jujitsu, discipline Brazilian jiu-jitsu (BJJ, Ne-waza) which is very popular in his homecountry United Arab Emirates. He was trained by Alex Paz and Maiky Reiter and in 2014 he obtained black belt in BJJ. He is five times world champion in Ne-waza/BJJ under sports governing body JJIF. 

He also participates at pro level tournaments which many times use title World Championships but are regulated by private sport bodies – UAEJJF and IBJJF. As black belt since 2014 he is waiting for big pro tournament title.

Results

References

External links
Faisal Al Ketbi at UAE Jiu Jitsu Federation
Profile of Faisal Al-Ketbi on UWW database v.1
Profile of Faisal Al-Ketbi on UWW database v.2

1987 births
Living people
World Games gold medalists
Competitors at the 2017 World Games
Wrestlers at the 2010 Asian Games
Ju-jitsu practitioners at the 2018 Asian Games
Medalists at the 2018 Asian Games
Asian Games gold medalists for the United Arab Emirates
Asian Games medalists in ju-jitsu
20th-century Emirati people
21st-century Emirati people